Bruno Amorim may refer to:
Bruno Amorim (sailor) (born 1975), Brazilian sailor
Bruno Amorim (footballer) (born 1998), Portuguese footballer who plays as a forward